5126 Achaemenides  is a Jupiter trojan from the Greek camp, approximately  in diameter. It was discovered on 1 February 1989, by American astronomer Carolyn Shoemaker at the Palomar Observatory in California. The dark Jovian asteroid belongs the 100 largest Jupiter trojans and has a long rotation period of 32.4 hours. It was named after one of Odysseus's crew members, Achaemenides, from Greek mythology.

Orbit and classification 

Achaemenides is a dark Jovian asteroid orbiting in the leading Greek camp at Jupiter's  Lagrangian point, 60° ahead of the Gas Giant's orbit in a 1:1 resonance . It is also a non-family asteroid in the Jovian background population. It orbits the Sun at a distance of 5.1–5.4 AU once every 12 years (4,385 days; semi-major axis of 5.24 AU). Its orbit has an eccentricity of 0.02 and an inclination of 30° with respect to the ecliptic. The body's observation arc begins with a precovery at Palomar in January 1953, more than 36 years prior to its official discovery observation.

Physical characteristics 

Achaemenides is an assumed C-type asteroid.

Rotation period 

In April 22015, a rotational lightcurve of Achaemenides was obtained from photometric observations by Daniel Coley at the Center for Solar System Studies, in collaboration with Robert Stephens and Linda French. Lightcurve analysis gave a rotation period of  hours with a brightness amplitude of 0.36 magnitude. While not being a slow rotator, Achaemenides has one of the longest periods of all larger Jupiter trojans (see table below).

Diameter and albedo 

According to the surveys carried out by the Japanese Akari satellite and the NEOWISE mission of NASA's Wide-field Infrared Survey Explorer, Achaemenides measures 48.57 and 51.92 kilometers in diameter and its surface has an albedo of 0.068 and 0.050, respectively.

The Collaborative Asteroid Lightcurve Link assumes a standard albedo for a carbonaceous asteroid of 0.057 and calculates a diameter of 44.22 kilometers based on an absolute magnitude of 10.5.

Naming 

This minor planet was named from Greek mythology after the Greek warrior Achaemenides, one of few surviving members of Odysseus's crew. Left behind when Odysseus fled the blinded Cyclops, he was later rescued by the Trojan Aeneas. The official naming citation was published by the Minor Planet Center on 4 June 1993.

Notes

References

External links 
 Asteroid Lightcurve Database (LCDB), query form (info )
 Dictionary of Minor Planet Names, Google books
 Discovery Circumstances: Numbered Minor Planets (5001)-(10000) – Minor Planet Center
 Asteroid 5126 Achaemenides at the Small Bodies Data Ferret 
 
 

005126
Discoveries by Carolyn S. Shoemaker
Named minor planets
19890201